Turkey competed at the 2016 Winter Youth Olympics in Lillehammer, Norway from 12 to 21 February 2016.

Alpine skiing

Boys

Girls

Cross-country skiing

Boys

Girls

Curling

Mixed team

Team
Tunc Esenboga
Oguzhan Karakurt
Beyzanur Konuksever
Berivan Polat

Round Robin

Draw 1

Draw 2

Draw 3

Draw 4

Draw 5

Draw 6

Draw 7

Tiebreaker

Quarterfinals

Mixed doubles

Luge

Ski jumping

Snowboarding

Snowboard cross

See also
Turkey at the 2016 Summer Olympics

References

2016 in Turkish sport
Nations at the 2016 Winter Youth Olympics
Winter 2016